Naam ( We) is a 2003 Indian Tamil language drama film written and directed by Sabapathy Dekshinamurthy. The film is produced Prakash Raj, who himself starred in an antagonistic role, while an ensemble cast of newcomers including Jayavarma and Rashmi Murali formed primary roles. The film released in September 2003 to positive reviews from critics. The film was a remake of Telugu film Aithe.

Cast
Jayavarma as Ramesh
Rashmi Murali as Gayatri
Prakash Raj as Irfan Khan
Sundar as Sethu
Mukesh as Kutty
Vinod as Sharath
Pyramid Natarajan as Selvendran
Kalabhavan Mani as a police officer
Ilavarasu
Sridhar
Mahanadhi Shankar
Suseenthiran as guy at tea shop (uncredited)

Soundtrack
Soundtrack had only one song composed by Kalyani Malik who composed the original film.
Kanavugal - Maragathamani

Release
The film opened to positive reviews, with Malathi Rangarajan of The Hindu noting "Prakashraj and Saba Kailash can be proud of their offering that sends across a positive message to the youth." Sify gave the film a verdict of "above average". Malini Mannath of Chennai Online noted that "A thriller, it's worth a watch, for  novel script and treatment, the twist in the story, and the freshness of the lead players". Another critic noted "the movie has a very different story and a clever screenplay that keeps us guessing".

References

External links

2003 films
2000s Tamil-language films
Indian crime thriller films
Tamil remakes of Telugu films
Films directed by Sabapathy Dekshinamurthy
2003 crime thriller films